The Neandertal (also , ; sometimes called "the Neander Valley" in English) is a small valley of the river Düssel in the German state of North Rhine-Westphalia, located about  east of Düsseldorf, the capital city of North Rhine-Westphalia. The valley lies within the limits of the towns of Erkrath and Mettmann. In August 1856, the area became famous for the discovery of Neanderthal 1, one of the first specimens of Homo neanderthalensis to be found.

The Neandertal was originally a limestone canyon widely known for its rugged scenery, waterfalls and caves. However, industrial quarrying during the 19th and 20th centuries removed most of the limestone and dramatically changed the shape of the valley. It was during such a quarrying operation that the bones of the original Neanderthal man were found in a cave known as Kleine Feldhofer Grotte. Neither the cave nor the cliff in which the bones were located still exist.

During the 19th century, the valley was called  (Neander's Cave) and, after 1850, . It was named after Joachim Neander, a 17th-century German pastor and hymnwriter.  is the Graeco-Roman translation of his family name ; both names mean "new man". Neumann lived in nearby Düsseldorf and loved the valley for giving him the inspiration for his compositions.
 
Scientific names, such as Homo neanderthalensis and Homo sapiens neanderthalensis for Neanderthal remained unchanged, because the laws of taxonomy retain the original spelling at the time of naming. However, Neanderthal station never changed its name to conform with the new German orthography and the modern Neanderthal Museum retains the original spelling.

Excavations 
Since the initial discovery of the specimen of the valley, there have been additional excavations, wherein multiple artifacts and human skeletal fragments have been found. Excavations have found two cranial fragments that seem to fit onto the original Neandertal 1 calotte (bones of the cranial vault). Excavations performed in 1997 and 2000 found new human skeletal pieces. There are questions as to whether these remains are those of Neandertals. Two cranial pieces were unearthed: one, a left zygomatic and partial body and second, a right piece of temporal bone. These pieces appeared to fit the Neandertal 1 calotte perfectly, although these pieces are not specifically from Neandertals. These discoveries may or may not be attributable to the Neandertals but exhibit similar characteristics.

See also 
 Neanderthal Museum

References

External links

 Neanderthal Man type site rediscovered

Archaeological sites in Germany
Mettmann (district)
Neanderthal sites
Prehistoric sites in Germany
Tourist attractions in North Rhine-Westphalia
Valleys of North Rhine-Westphalia